The 1938–39 NHL season was the 22nd season of the National Hockey League (NHL). Seven teams each played 48 games. The Boston Bruins were the Stanley Cup winners as they beat the Toronto Maple Leafs four games to one in the final series.

League business
Just prior to the start of the 1938–39 season, the league held a meeting to decide the fate of the Montreal Maroons. The team had requested a shift to St. Louis, but this was rejected after considerable discussion, resulting in the Maroons suspending operations for the season. They sold most of their players to the Canadiens, and it was evident that the Maroons were through for good. With only seven teams left, the NHL decided to go back to the one division format.

The Stanley Cup finals would be expanded to a best-of-seven format.

NHL president Frank Calder reached a new professional-amateur agreement with Canadian Amateur Hockey Association (CAHA) and its president W. G. Hardy in August 1938. The CAHA agreed not to allow international transfers for players on NHL reserve lists, and the NHL agreed not to sign any junior players without permission. It limited the number of amateur players which could be signed to contracts, and stipulated that both organizations use the same playing rules and recognize each other's suspensions.

Regular season
Prior to the start of the season, the Boston Bruins sold their star goaltender, Tiny Thompson, who had just won a record fourth Vezina Trophy, to the Detroit Red Wings The fans thought Art Ross was crazy, but soon they were applauding rookie Frank Brimsek, would go on to back-stop the Bruins to a first overall finish and a Stanley Cup victory. He wiped out Thompson's shutout sequence record with three consecutive shutouts. He nearly equalled his new record with three more. He ended the season with 10 shutouts, and earned the nickname "Mr. Zero". He also became the first goaltender to win both the Vezina Trophy and Calder Memorial Trophy in the same season.

Joseph Cattarinich died on December 7 of a heart attack following an eye operation. Cattarinich was the original goaltender of the Montreal Canadiens when they were formed in 1909 and later a part-owner of the team. He was 57.

The Montreal Canadiens eroded to the point where Jules Dugal replaced Cecil Hart as manager and coach. Dugal was not much better and the Canadiens finished sixth. One bright note was that Toe Blake won the scoring title, however, despite the poor showing of the team.

Chicago, after its Stanley Cup win the previous season, began floundering at mid-season and owner Frederic McLaughlin was displeased. Accordingly, he fired coach Bill Stewart and hired left wing Paul Thompson in his place. But the Black Hawks continued to lose and finished last.

The New York Americans, up in third place at mid-season, proceeded to fall into a big slump in the second half and though they finished fourth, they were below .500 and had the worst defence in the league. Part of the problem was the retirements of Ching Johnson and Hap Day on defence. Al Murray was also out of action for quite a time. Still, goaltender Earl Robertson found himself on the second all-star team.

Final standings

Playoffs

Playoff bracket

Quarterfinals

(3) Toronto Maple Leafs vs. (4) New York Americans

(5) Detroit Red Wings vs. (6) Montreal Canadiens

Semifinals

(1) Boston Bruins vs. (2) New York Rangers

This series was the first to need seven games in NHL history; additionally, the Rangers were the first team in NHL history to force a Game seven after losing the first three games of a series. Mel Hill, a right wing for the Bruins, scored a record three overtime goals in a single series.

(3) Toronto Maple Leafs vs. (5) Detroit Red Wings

Stanley Cup Finals

Awards

Player statistics

Scoring leaders

Note: GP = Games played, G = Goals, A = Assists, PTS = Points, PIM = Penalties in minutes

Leading goaltenders

Coaches
Boston Bruins: Art Ross
Chicago Black Hawks: Bill Stewart and Paul Thompson
Detroit Red Wings: Jack Adams
Montreal Canadiens: Cecil Hart
New York Americans: Red Dutton
New York Rangers: Lester Patrick
Toronto Maple Leafs: Dick Irvin

Debuts
The following is a list of players of note who played their first NHL game in 1938–39 (listed with their first team, asterisk(*) marks debut in playoffs):
Roy Conacher, Boston Bruins
Frank Brimsek, Boston Bruins
Ab DeMarco, Chicago Black Hawks
Don Grosso, Detroit Red Wings
Sid Abel, Detroit Red Wings
Jack Stewart, Detroit Red Wings

Last games
The following is a list of players of note that played their last game in the NHL in 1938–39 (listed with their last team):
Russ Blinco, Chicago Black Hawks
Paul Thompson, Chicago Black Hawks
Baldy Northcott, Chicago Black Hawks
Alex Levinsky, Chicago Black Hawks
Bob Gracie, Chicago Black Hawks
Larry Aurie, Detroit Red Wings
Herbie Lewis, Detroit Red Wings
Dave Trottier, Detroit Red Wings
Babe Siebert, Montreal Canadiens
Jimmy Ward, Montreal Canadiens

See also
1938-39 NHL transactions
List of Stanley Cup champions
1938 in sports
1939 in sports

References
 
 
 
 
 

Notes

External links
Hockey Database
NHL.com

 
1938–39 in Canadian ice hockey by league
1938–39 in American ice hockey by league